"Goosebumps" is a pop song written by Terry Britten and BA Robertson and originally released by Robertson in January 1979 as the first single from his debut album Initial Success. The single flopped, but later that year, Australian pop singer Christie Allen covered the song, which peaked at number 3 on Kent Music Report in Australia and sold over 60,000 copies

The song was his first release on Asylum Records after they signed him due to the strength of this song on a demo tape he sent to their parent company Warner Communications.

Christie Allen version 

Allen released her cover in August 1979 as the third single from her debut studio album, Magic Rhythm. The song was released as "Goose Bumps" on both the single and the album. It released in the US via Polydor Records and in Europe via WEA. At the 1979 Countdown awards, the song was nominated for Most Popular Single, won by "Computer Games" by Mi-Sex. "Goose Bumps" became the first ever single by Mushroom Records to be certified gold in Australia.

Reception
Cash Box magazine said "Bouncy bass and synthesiser set the tick-tock danceable pace for Christie Allen's crystal voice."

Track listing 
7" (K 7608) 
Side A – "Goosebumps" - 2:50
Side B – "Ships That Pass Through the Night" - 3:20

7" (International) 
Side A – "Goosebumps" - 2:50
Side B - "Count Me Out"

Charts

Weekly charts

Year-end charts

Certifications

References 

1979 songs
1979 singles
BA Robertson songs
Christie Allen songs
Songs written by BA Robertson
Songs written by Terry Britten
Asylum Records singles
Mushroom Records singles